Streets of Heaven is the fourth studio album by Australian country music artist Sherrié Austin. It was released in 2003 by Broken Bow Records and peaked at #22 on the Billboard Top Country Albums chart. The album includes the singles "Streets of Heaven" and "Drivin' into the Sun."

Track listing

Personnel
 Adapted from AllMusic:
 Tim Akers - keyboards
 Sally Barris - backing vocals
 Larry Beard - acoustic guitar
 Steven Bliss - acoustic guitar
 Mike Brignardello - bass guitar
 J. T. Corenflos - electric guitar
 Larry Franklin - fiddle, mandolin
 Paul Franklin - pedal steel guitar
 Owen Hale - drums
 Dann Huff - acoustic guitar, electric guitar
 Mike Johnson - pedal steel guitar
 Michael Joyce - bass guitar
 Wayne Killius - drums
 Kostas - backing vocals
 Tim Lauer - keyboards
 Chris McHugh - drums
 Jerry McPherson - electric guitar
 Gary Morse - pedal steel guitar
 Jimmy Nichols - keyboards
 Russ Pahl - banjo, resonator guitar, electric guitar, lap steel guitar, pedal steel guitar
 Kim Parent - backing vocals
 Steven Sheehan - acoustic guitar
 Russell Terrell - backing vocals
 John Willis - acoustic guitar, electric guitar
 Lonnie Wilson - drums
 Jonathan Yudkin - cello, fiddle, kalimba, mandolin, viola

Chart performance

References

[ Streets of Heaven] at Allmusic

2003 albums
Sherrié Austin albums
BBR Music Group albums